Cutaneous columnar cysts are a cutaneous condition, a group of different cysts lined by columnar epithelium.  Types of cysts included in this group are:

 Bronchogenic cyst
 Branchial cyst
 Thyroglossal duct cyst
 Cutaneous ciliated cyst
 Median raphe cyst

See also 
 Pseudocyst of the auricle
 List of cutaneous conditions

References 

Epidermal nevi, neoplasms, and cysts